"Bang!" is a song recorded by South Korean girl group After School. This song marked the first appearance of the group's eighth member, Lizzy.
It was later released in Japanese for the group's Japan debut. The song was released on August 17, 2011, in 3 editions. The Japanese version does not include former member Bekah, who left the group after the end of promotions for the group's first Korean album "Virgin" to become a designer.

Background 
"Bang!" is After School's third Korean single. The title track, which was used as the lead single, was originally planned to be included in After School's second single "Because of You," but was delayed due to the lyricist and composer wanting to make the track more complete. The single's concept displayed the group wearing sexy marching band outfits, and it was later revealed that Kahi created the concept. Kahi stated that after watching the American film Drumline, she fell in love with the marching band style and wanted to do a marching band concept since becoming an After School member. The group practiced playing the drums for five months with a trainer for the concept.

The title track reached #17 on the Gaon 2010 digital download charts with 2,374,731 copies sold.

More than one year later, the single was released as their official Japanese debut. The single was released in three versions, two CD+DVD editions and one CD only edition. Both CD+DVD editions include the same track list, however the A edition features contents in Japanese, while they are in Korean for the B edition. The CD only edition also includes the original Korean version of the song, plus two instrumental tracks.

Korean choreography controversy 

After School was accused of choreographic plagiarism after German dancer and choreographer Camillo Lauricella received messages saying that the group "stole some of our moves for their music video of their song "Bang!"." Lauricella further stated, "On the one hand it's cool & flattering. But on the other hand... What do you guys think?" Lauricella and his good friend Nika Kljun originally created the choreography to Black McGrath's song "The Night" and uploaded it on YouTube in February 2010.

Pledis Entertainment responded to the allegations stating, "There is a problem in deeming choreography as plagiarized just because a single dance move less than 3 seconds long is somewhat similar to another. The choreography for "Bang!" is strictly the end product of our creation, put together by Pledis' Korean and American choreographers." They went on to further say, "Dance is a language spoken through the body for everyone, regardless of cultural barriers. To give a comparison, one would not say that a certain modern choreography is plagiarized because it is similar to a Korean culture dance. We hope no more disputes and controversies are generated over this matter."

Lauricella responded to Pledis Entertainments statement in a YouTube video saying, "Yes, I've seen what Pledis Entertainment had to say about it. And honestly, I didn't really expect anything else. Like, it's so ignorant and really not cool at all." Lauricella later claimed that more than three seconds of his dance move was stolen, unlike what Pledis Entertainment had stated.

Track listing

Trivia
The Korean version of "Bang!" used in the CD only edition of the Japanese single is the "2011 New Recordings" version from the group's first album Virgin.

Chart performance
The single was released early in South Korea after Pledis Entertainment announced that preorder sales for the single had reached over 30,000 on online and offline retailers. Following the release of the single, "Bang!" remained in the top 5 on various online music charts and continued to steadily rise. The single debuted at #4 on the Gaon Singles Chart before peaking at #2 the following week. The physical single debuted and peaked at #2 on the Gaon Album Chart, behind Girls' Generation.

The Japanese version debuted at #6 on Oricon's Daily Singles Chart and #7 on the weekly chart selling 23,760 copies. To date, the single has sold over 42,363 copies in Japan.

Korean version

Album chart

Singles chart

Japanese version

References

External links
 Official website

2011 singles
Japanese-language songs
Korean-language songs
After School (band) songs
Hybe Corporation singles